Rhein-Main may refer to:

Frankfurt Rhine-Main, a metropolitan area in central Germany
Rhein-Main Air Base, a former U.S. air base
Rhein-Main-Flughafen or Frankfurt Airport